Michael Dondril Nattiel (born November 8, 1980) is an American former college and professional football player who was a linebacker in the National Football League (NFL) for two seasons during the early 2000s.  Nattiel played college football for the University of Florida, and thereafter, he played professionally for the Minnesota Vikings of the NFL.

Early years 

Nattiel was born in Gainesville, Florida in 1980.  He attended Newberry High School in Newberry, Florida, where he played for the Newberry Fighting Panthers high school football team.  Nattiel was a three-time Florida Class 3A all-state honoree at linebacker, and was recognized as a high school All-American by SuperPrep, PrepStar and National Blue Chips.

College career 

Nattiel accepted an athletic scholarship to attend the University of Florida in Gainesville, Florida, and played outside linebacker for coach Steve Spurrier and coach Ron Zook's Florida Gators football teams from 1999 to 2002.  Nattiel recovered a key fumble in the Gators' Southeastern Conference (SEC) championship victory over the Auburn Tigers in 2000, and was an honorable mention All-SEC selection in 2002.

Professional career 

In his two-season NFL career, Nattiel played in thirty-two games in a backup role, the highlight of which was an 80-yard interception return for a touchdown in 2003.

Personal 

Nattiel is the nephew of Ricky Nattiel, former standout wide receiver for the Florida Gators and the NFL's Denver Broncos.  After his professional career, he returned to the state of Florida to coach football, and returned to his home town Panthers in 2011 as defensive coordinator.

See also 

 History of the Minnesota Vikings
 List of Florida Gators in the NFL Draft

References

Bibliography 

 Carlson, Norm, University of Florida Football Vault: The History of the Florida Gators, Whitman Publishing, LLC, Atlanta, Georgia (2007).  .
 Golenbock, Peter, Go Gators!  An Oral History of Florida's Pursuit of Gridiron Glory, Legends Publishing, LLC, St. Petersburg, Florida (2002).  .
 Hairston, Jack, Tales from the Gator Swamp: A Collection of the Greatest Gator Stories Ever Told, Sports Publishing, LLC, Champaign, Illinois (2002).  .

1980 births
Living people
Players of American football from Gainesville, Florida
American football linebackers
Florida Gators football players
Minnesota Vikings players